The Abu Musallam incident was an event where a large group of 3000 people, including Salafist Muslims, killed a small group of Shias in their home in a suburb of Cairo on June 23 2013. Among the dead was sheikh Hassan Shehata who was a prominent religious figure among the Egyptian Shia community. Some news sources described the mob as "takfiris", while others described it as being a result of anti-Shia rhetoric steaming from sermons at Friday prayers.

References

2013 in Egypt
21st-century mass murder in Egypt
Anti-Shi'ism
Attacks in Egypt in 2013
June 2013 events in Africa
Mass murder in 2013
Mass stabbings
Religiously motivated violence in Egypt
Stabbing attacks in 2013
Violence against Shia Muslims